The FC Istiklol 2018 season is Istiklol's tenth Tajik League season. They are the current defending Tajik League Champions and will also participate in the Tajik Cup, Tajik Supercup and AFC Cup, entering at the group stage.

Season Events
After being knocked out of the 2018 AFC Cup at the group stage, manager Mukhsin Mukhamadiev resigned as manager six-days later on 22 May 2018, with Alisher Tukhtaev being appointed as acting head coach.

Squad

Transfers

In

Out

Released

Trial

Friendlies

TFF Cup

Preliminary round

Finals Group

Knockout phase

Competitions

Tajik Supercup

Tajik League

Results summary

Results by round

Results

League table

Tajik Cup

Final

AFC Cup

Group stage

Squad statistics

Appearances and goals

|-
|colspan="14"|Youth team players:

|-
|colspan="14"|Players away from Istiklol on loan:
|-
|colspan="14"|Players who left Istiklol during the season:

|}

Goal scorers

Disciplinary record

References

External links 
 FC Istiklol Official Web Site

FC Istiklol seasons
Istiklol